Chincoteague ( or ) is a town in Accomack County, Virginia, U.S.  The town includes the whole of Chincoteague Island and an area of adjacent water.  The population was 2,941 at the 2010 census. The town is known for the Chincoteague Ponies, although these are not actually on the island of Chincoteague but on nearby Assateague Island. These ponies and the annual Pony Penning Day are the subject of Marguerite Henry's 1947 children's book Misty of Chincoteague, which was made into the 1961 family film Misty,  filmed on location.

Geography
Chincoteague is located at  (37.934673, −75.367805). It lies at an elevation of three feet.

History

Chincoteague was a barrier island until the mid-1800s, when Assateague migrated so far south that it shielded Chincoteague from the ocean. Daniel Jenifer became the first English landowner. In 1671, settlers came to the island, and by 1672 there were large farms by Bishops, Bowdens, Jesters and Tarrs. By 1838, there were 36 houses on the island. In 1861, with the Civil War looming following the attack on Fort Sumter, the island voted 132-2 not to secede from the Union and against slavery. The town saw minor action in the war via the Battle of Cockle Creek, which was fought in the bay in 1861.

The Native American name for the island is Gingoteague, and the name of the town "Chincoteague" first appeared in the Decisions of the United States Board on Geographic Names in 1943.

In 1962, a major nor'easter winter storm, the Ash Wednesday Storm, struck the coast. The town was completely underwater, and went for days without electricity.  The storm destroyed almost all structures on Assateague Island, where development was just beginning.  Following this, most of the island was preserved from development as Assateague Island National Seashore in 1965.

The Assateague Lighthouse and Captain Timothy Hill House are listed on the National Register of Historic Places.

Chincoteague ponies

Legend has it that the feral ponies on Assateague are descendants of survivors of a Spanish galleon that sank on its way to Spain during a storm in 1750 off the east coast, but the likelihood is that they are actually descended from domesticated stock, brought to the island by Eastern Shore farmers in the 17th century to avoid fencing requirements and taxation.

In the Pony Penning, which has been held annually since 1925, horses swim across the shallow water between the islands. At "slack tide" on the Wednesday before the last Thursday of every July, Chincoteague's "Saltwater Cowboys" herd the wild Chincoteague ponies from Assateague Island, across the Assateague Channel, to neighboring Chincoteague Island.  If any animal is too small or weak to make the swim, it is placed on a barge and ferried over. All the horses are herded into large pens after running through the middle of town and down Main Street. Pony Penning takes place on the last consecutive Wednesday and Thursday in July. The actual swim occurs on Wednesday, the Chincoteague Volunteer Fire Company auctions that year's foals on Thursday, and on Friday the remaining ponies swim back to Assateague.

Tourism

The town features numerous small hotels, bed and breakfasts, and campgrounds that serve visitors to the region, such as those patronizing the beaches.  The island also features many restaurants, miniature golf courses and ice cream parlors, including Island Creamery.  The island contains two museums: Beebe Ranch, and the Museum of Chincoteague Island. With the designation of the nearby Wallops Island Flight Facility as the launch site for the Antares rocket and Cygnus cargo module used to resupply the International Space Station, there are large influxes of tourists whenever an Antares launch occurs.

Demographics

As of the census of 2000, there were 4,317 people, 2,068 households, and 1,244 families residing in the town. The population density was 448.2 people per square mile (173.1/km2). There were 3,970 housing units at an average density of 412.2 per square mile (159.2/km2). The racial makeup of the town was 96.92% White, 0.95% African American, 0.28% Native American, 0.28% Asian, 0.37% from other races, and 1.20% from two or more races. Hispanic or Latino of any race were 0.53% of the population.

There were 2,068 households, out of which 21.5% had children under the age of 18 living with them, 48.8% were married couples living together, 8.3% had a female householder with no husband present, and 39.8% were non-families. 33.8% of all households were made up of individuals, and 13.9% had someone living alone who was 65 years of age or older. The average household size was 2.08 and the average family size was 2.63.

In the town, the population was spread out, with 18.0% under the age of 18, 5.5% from 18 to 24, 24.7% from 25 to 44, 30.9% from 45 to 64, and 20.9% who were 65 years of age or older. The median age was 46 years. For every 100 females, there were 94.4 males. For every 100 females age 18 and over, there were 93.8 males.

The median income for a household in the town was $28,514, and the median income for a family was $33,425. Males had a median income of $27,075 versus $20,859 for females. The per capita income for the town was $20,367. About 9.7% of families and 12.7% of the population were below the poverty line, including 22.9% of those under age 18 and 9.4% of those age 65 or over.

Climate
The climate in this area is characterized by hot, humid summers and generally mild to cool winters.  According to the Köppen Climate Classification system, Chincoteague has a humid subtropical climate, abbreviated "Cfa" on climate maps.

Notes

Notable people
 Delbert "Cigar" Daisey, waterfowl decoy wood carver
 Bill Hinnant, actor on stage, film, and television; born in Chincoteague in 1935; drowned in 1978 in the Dominican Republic
 Skip Hinnant, actor and comedian, born in Chincoteague in 1940

See also
 Chincoteague Fire Department

References

External links

Town of Chincoteague official website

 
Towns in Virginia
Towns in Accomack County, Virginia
Islands of Accomack County, Virginia
1908 establishments in Virginia
Coastal islands of Virginia